The Cathedral of the Immaculate Conception is a Catholic cathedral in Port of Spain, Trinidad and Tobago.  It is the seat of the Archdiocese of Port of Spain.  Construction started in 1816 and it was completed in 1851.  The same year the cathedral was given the honorary status of a minor basilica.

References

19th-century Roman Catholic church buildings
Buildings and structures in Port of Spain
Cathedrals in Trinidad and Tobago
Roman Catholic cathedrals in Trinidad and Tobago
Roman Catholic churches completed in 1851
Basilica churches in the Caribbean
1851 establishments in the British Empire
1850s establishments in the Caribbean